The Senate Republican Conference is the formal organization of the Republican Senators in the United States Senate, who currently number 49. Over the last century, the mission of the conference has expanded and been shaped as a means of informing the media of the opinions and activities of Senate Republicans. Today the Senate Republican Conference assists Republican Senators by providing a full range of communications services including graphics, radio, television, and the Internet. Its current Chairman is Senator John Barrasso, and its Vice Chairwoman is currently Senator Shelley Moore Capito.

Current hierarchy
Effective , the conference leadership is as follows:

Mitch McConnell (KY) as Senate Minority Leader
John Thune (SD) as Senate Minority Whip
John Barrasso (WY) as Chairman of the Republican Conference
Joni Ernst (IA) as Chairwoman of the Senate Republican Policy Committee
Shelley Moore Capito (WV) as Vice Chairwoman of the Republican Conference
Steve Daines (MT) as Chairman of the National Republican Senatorial Committee
Mike Lee (UT) as Chairman of the Senate Republican Steering Committee
Mike Crapo (ID) as Senate Republican Chief Deputy Whip
Chuck Grassley (IA) as President pro tempore emeritus

History
The Republican Conference of the United States Senate is a descendant of the early American party caucus that decided party policies, approved appointees, and selected candidates. The meetings were private, and early records of the deliberations do not exist. Senate Republicans began taking formal minutes only in 1911, and they began referring to their organization as the "conference" in 1913. An early outgrowth of the effort to enhance party unity was the creation, in 1874, of a steering committee to prepare a legislative schedule for consideration by the conference. The committee became a permanent part of the Republican organization.

The steering committee, formalized Republican "leadership" in the 19th century was minimal; most legislative guidance came from powerful committee chairmen managing particular bills. The conference began to acquire significance, however, with the election of Senator William B. Allison of Iowa as Chairman in 1897, and during the terms of successors such as Senator Orville H. Platt of Connecticut and Senator Nelson W. Aldrich of Rhode Island. The chairman in 1915, Senator Jacob H. Gallinger of New Hampshire, who two years earlier had elected a whip to maintain a quorum to conduct Senate business. Senator James W. Wadsworth, Jr. of New York was elected both conference secretary and whip; a week later the responsibilities were divided between Senator Wadsworth as Secretary and Senator Charles Curtis of Kansas, who was elected whip.

The conference continued to meet in private to assure confidentiality and candor. This practice was suspended only once, on May 27, 1919, when the conference reaffirmed its commitment to the seniority system for choosing committee chairmen by electing Senator Boies Penrose of Pennsylvania as chairman of the finance committee over objections from Progressive Republican insurgents. (This was apparently the only open party conference in the history of the Senate.)

During this period, the Chairman also served as informal floor leader. One reason for the lack of a formal post was the fact that committee chairmen usually took responsibility to move to proceed to the consideration of measures reported by their respective committees and managed the legislation on the floor. The first recorded Conference election of a formal floor leader was held March 5, 1925, when the conference chairman, Senator Curtis of Kansas, was unanimously chosen to serve in both posts.

Throughout the 1920s, when Republicans held the Senate majority, the conference met chiefly at the beginning of each session to make committee assignments; for the remainder of the session, Members were notified of the order of business by mail. This slow pace continued through the 1930s, when Republican Senators were so few that they dispensed with a permanent whip, and the conference chairman and floor leader, Senator Charles L. McNary of Oregon, appointed Senators to serve as whip on particular pieces of legislation.

Senator McNary died in 1944, and the posts of conference chairman and floor leader were separated in 1945. Senator Arthur H. Vandenberg of Michigan became chairman and Senator Wallace H. White, Jr., of Maine became floor leader. This separation has continued to be one of the chief differences between the Republican and Democratic Conferences, since the floor leader of the Democrats has continued to serve as their conference chairman.

In 1944, Senator Robert A. Taft of Ohio, still in his first term, persuaded Republicans to revive their steering committee, and he became its chairman. In 1946, it became the Republican Policy Committee under legislation appropriating equal funds for majority and minority parties (a separate steering committee was created in 1974 but its operations are funded by member dues, not by Congress). Until the mid-1970s the staffs of the Conference and Policy Committee were housed together under a single staff director who administered their budgets jointly. Staff separation was begun during 1979–1980, while Senator Bob Packwood of Oregon was chairman of the conference, and completed under Senator James McClure of Idaho. Under Senator McClure's leadership in the 1980s, the conference began providing television, radio and graphics services for Republican Senators. Senator Connie Mack, as conference chairman, in 1997 created the first digital Information Technology department to communicate the Republican agenda over the web.

Meetings of Republican Conference 
The form and frequency of conference meetings has depended upon leadership personalities and legislative circumstances. Since the late 1950s, the conference has met at the beginning of each United States Congress to elect the leadership, approve committee assignments, and attend to other organizational matters. Although other meetings are called from time to time to discuss pending issues, the weekly Policy Committee luncheons afford a regular forum for discussion among Senators. As a former Republican Leader, Senator Everett M. Dirksen of Illinois, said in 1959:

When the Republican Policy Committee meets weekly, it is actually a meeting of the Republican Conference over the luncheon table, at which time we discuss all matters of pending business. Thus, so far as possible, all the information which is within the possession and the command of the leadership is freely diffused to every member.

At the time Senator Dirksen spoke, the elected party leadership included: chairman of the conference, secretary of the conference, floor leader, whip (now assistant floor leader), and chairman of the Policy Committee. On July 31, 1980, Conference rules were amended to make the chairman of the National Republican Senatorial Committee an elected position, a change which brought the rules into conformity with what had become custom.

"Conference" versus "caucus" 
The Republican Conference has never been a caucus in the dictionary sense, that is, a "partisan legislative group that uses caucus procedures to make decisions binding on its members." Even during the tense years of Reconstruction, Republican Senators were not bound to vote according to conference decisions. In 1867, for example, when Senator Charles Sumner of Massachusetts refused to follow conference policy on an issue, and Senator William P. Fessenden of Maine charged, "you should not have voted on the subject [in Conference] if you did not mean to be bound by the decision of the majority," Sumner retorted, "I am a Senator of the United States," and no attempt was made to discipline him. Such independence was reiterated on March 12, 1925, when a resolution introduced by Senator Wesley L. Jones of Washington passed in the conference without objection:

To make clear and beyond question the long-settled policy of Republicans that our Conferences are not caucuses or of binding effect upon those participating therein but are meetings solely for the purpose of exchanging views to promote harmony and united action so far as possible.

Be It Resolved: That no Senator attending this Conference or any Conference held hereafter shall be deemed to be bound in any way by any action taken by such Conference, but he shall be entirely free to act upon any matter considered by the Conference as his judgment may dictate, and it shall not be necessary for any Senator to give notice of his intention to take action different from any recommended by the Conference."

Floor leaders

List of conference chairmen and chairwomen
The Republican conference of the United States Senate chooses a conference chairperson. The office was created in the mid-19th century with the founding of the Republican party. The office of "party floor leader" was not created until 1925, and for twenty years, the Senate's Republican conference chairman was also the floor leader.

In recent years, the conference chair has come to be regarded as the third-ranking Republican in the Senate, behind the floor leader and whip. According to Congressional Quarterly, "The conference chairman manages the private meetings to elect floor leaders, handles distribution of committee assignments and helps set legislative priorities. The modern version drives the conference’s message, with broadcast studios for television and radio."

List of Secretary and Vice Chairman
The Vice Chair of the Senate Republican Conference, also known previously as the Conference Secretary until 2001, is the fifth-ranking leadership position (behind the Policy Committee chair) within the Republican Party conference in the United States Senate. The vice-chair/secretary is responsible for keeping the minutes of the Senate Republican Conference, and serves alongside the Senate Republican Conference Chairperson.  The current vice chairwoman is Joni Ernst, serving since 2019.

Members

Alabama
 Katie Britt
 Tommy Tuberville
Alaska
 Lisa Murkowski, Ranking Member of the Senate Indian Affairs Committee  
 Dan Sullivan
Arkansas
 John Boozman, Ranking Member of the Senate Agriculture Committee
 Tom Cotton
Florida
 Marco Rubio, Ranking Member of the Senate Intelligence Committee
 Rick Scott, Chair of the National Republican Senatorial Committee
Idaho
 Mike Crapo, Ranking Member of the Senate Finance Committee
 Jim Risch, Ranking Member of the Senate Foreign Relations Committee
Indiana
 Todd Young
 Mike Braun
Iowa
 Chuck Grassley, President Pro Tempore Emeritus of the United States Senate and Ranking Member of the Senate Judiciary Committee
 Joni Ernst, Vice Chair of the Senate Republican Conference
Kansas
 Jerry Moran, Ranking Member of the Senate Veterans Affairs Committee
 Roger Marshall
Kentucky
 Mitch McConnell, Senate Minority Leader
 Rand Paul, Ranking Member of the Senate Small Business Committee
Louisiana
 Bill Cassidy
 John Kennedy
Maine
 Susan Collins
Mississippi
 Roger Wicker, Ranking Member of the Senate Commerce Committee
 Cindy Hyde-Smith
Missouri
 Eric Schmitt
 Josh Hawley

Montana
 Steve Daines
Nebraska
 Deb Fischer
 Ben Sasse (resigned January, 2023)
North Carolina
 Ted Budd
 Thom Tillis
North Dakota
 John Hoeven
 Kevin Cramer
Ohio
 J. D. Vance
Oklahoma
 Markwayne Mullin
 James Lankford, Chair of the Senate Ethics Committee
South Carolina
 Lindsey Graham, Ranking Member of the Senate Budget Committee 
 Tim Scott, Ranking Member of the Senate Aging Committee
South Dakota
 John Thune, Senate Minority Whip
 Mike Rounds
Tennessee
 Marsha Blackburn
 Bill Hagerty
Texas
 John Cornyn, Ranking Member of the Senate Narcotics Caucus
 Ted Cruz
Utah
 Mike Lee
 Mitt Romney
West Virginia
 Shelley Moore Capito, Ranking Member of the Senate Environment Committee
Wisconsin
 Ron Johnson
Wyoming
 John Barrasso, Chair of the Senate Republican Conference and Ranking Member of the Senate Energy and Natural Resources Committee
 Cynthia Lummis

Notes

References

External links
Official home of the Senate Republican Conference
About the Senate Republican Conference — The content of this article was derived from this public domain resource.
Information on Senate party leadership
 Minutes of the Senate Republican Conference: Sixty-second Congress through Eighty-eighth Congress, 1911-1964, edited by Wendy Wolff and Donald A. Ritchie. Washington: GPO, 1999, Senate Document 105-19.

Conference, Senate
Republican Conference
United States Senate
Lists related to the United States Senate